Piano Trio No. 4 may refer to:
 Piano Trio No. 4 (Beethoven)
 Piano Trio in A major (attributed to Johannes Brahms)
 Piano Trio No. 4 (Dvořák)
 Piano Trio No. 4 (Mozart)